, NAC, is a private junior college in Sakahogi, Gifu, Japan, established in 1967. Over 90% of the students are male.

External links
 Official website 

Educational institutions established in 1967
Private universities and colleges in Japan
Universities and colleges in Gifu Prefecture
Japanese junior colleges